Streptomyces aqsuensis is a Gram-positive and aerobic bacterium species from the genus of Streptomyces which has been isolated from ditch sediments from the Xinjiang Province in China.

See also 
 List of Streptomyces species

References 

aqsuensis
Bacteria described in 2018